Roccagloriosa is a town and comune in the province of Salerno in the Campania region of south-western Italy.

The town is located in southern Cilento. It borders with Alfano, Camerota, Celle di Bulgheria, Laurito, Rofrano, San Giovanni a Piro and Torre Orsaia.

See also
Bulgheria
Cilentan language

References

External links

 Roccagloriosa official website

Cities and towns in Campania
Localities of Cilento